Lycodes terraenovae, also called the Newfoundland eelpout, Atlantic eelpout or fish doctor, is a species of marine ray-finned fish belonging to the family Zoarcidae, the eelpouts. It is found in deep waters of the Atlantic Ocean.

Taxonomy 
Lycodes terraenovae was first formally described in 1896 by the Norwegian zoologist Robert Collett with the type locality given as the Newfoundland Banks in the northwestern Atlantic. Within the genus Lycodes this species is classified within the nominate subgenus, Lycodes. The specific name refers to Newfoundland, referring to the type locality of the Newfoundland Banks.

Description

It has a double lateral line. The body is scaled, the pores on the head are unreduced and the tail is long.

Distribution and habitat
Lycodes terraenovae is found in the Atlantic Ocean where it has been recorded from the Davis Strait, off Newfoundland and Middle Atlantic Bight in the Western North Atlantic and in the Eastern Atlantic from the Rockall Trough and Bill Bailey Bank, south to the waters off Mauritania and southwestern Africa.

Biology

Lycodes terraenovae eats sponge remains, polychaetes, shelled molluscs, crustaceans, brittle stars and pycnogonids. These fishes attain sexual maturity as they approach their maximum size and the females lay a small number of large eggs, these are  probably deposited in shallow depressions in mud.

Clavella pinguis is a copepod parasite of Lycodes terraenovae.

References

terraenovae
Fish described in 1896
Taxa named by Robert Collett